Travis Carter Enterprises (later known as Haas-Carter Motorsports, K Mart Racing, BelCar Motorsports and Richardson-Haas Motorsports) was a NASCAR and USAR Pro Cup team. It was mostly owned by former crew chief Travis Carter and Carl Haas. The team previously fielded entries in the Winston Cup Series before closing. It returned in 2007 to field a full-time entry for rookie Kyle Krisiloff.

Winston Cup

Beginnings
After purchasing Mach 1 Racing from Hal Needham following the 1989 season, Travis Carter Enterprises debuted at the 1990 Daytona 500, as the No. 98 Chevrolet sponsored by Winn-Dixie. Butch Miller was the driver, who finished 22nd. Miller drove the car in 23 races that year, posting one top-ten finish before he was replaced by Rick Mast, who finished out the year and garnered an additional top ten. In 1991, Jimmy Spencer took over as Banquet Foods was the sponsor,  and finished 25th in points. Spencer ran just seven races with the car in 1992, before the team suspended operations temporarily.

Multi-car

Travis Carter Enterprises returned in 1994 as the No. 23 Camel Cigarettes-sponsored Ford Thunderbird driven by Hut Stricklin. After posting one top ten finish that year, Stricklin was removed as Spencer returned to the team again. Spencer ran in the car for several years, the big change coming when Winston became the sponsor in 1998. That year, Spencer looked poised for a top-ten finish in points, but injuries kept him from doing that as he was replaced by Ted Musgrave and Frank Kimmel while he nursed his wounds. At the end of the year, Carter announced he would expand his team to a multi-car operation, with three-time champion Darrell Waltrip driving the No. 66 Kmart Ford and Haas coming on board as a partner. The new team had previously been the No. 27 owned by David Blair Motorsports. Waltrip amassed the largest number of DNQ's he had ever had during his career. In 2000, he retired from the Winston Cup, his lone highlight being an outside-pole qualifying effort at the Brickyard 400. Kmart also sponsored Spencer's car beginning in 2000, after the team's previous sponsorship agreement with R.J. Reynolds expired, with the team switching to No. 26 after acquiring the number from Roush Racing. Waltrip's replacement was Todd Bodine (who drove a third car in Waltrip’s final race, the No. 46) who won three pole positions and finished 29th in points. After 2001, Spencer departed, and Joe Nemechek signed on to replace him. Unfortunately, during the offseason, Kmart went into bankruptcy, and the team's status was in danger. Nemechek ran a mere handful races that year before his team was folded, and after subbing in several races afterward he signed with Hendrick Motorsports to drive the No. 25 car. Bodine attempted the first few races in the No. 66 and qualified on the pole for the Las Vegas race, but he eventually was parked for several weeks while the team looked for a sponsorship. Frank Kimmel returned for six races in the No. 26 with his National Pork Board sponsorship from the ARCA series. Bodine eventually returned to race the No. 26 after Haas-Carter found full-time sponsorship from Discover Card and split time in the ride with his older brother Geoffrey. The 66 car returned part-time later in the year, with Japanese racer Hideo Fukuyama running a handful of races.

BelCar Motorsports
 

In 2003, HCM merged with minority owner Sam Belnavis to form BelCar Motorsports. The No. 26 team switched to No. 54 with the U.S. National Guard as the sponsor. Bodine struggled, posting one-top ten finish and finishing 31st in points. Fukuyama, meanwhile, made an attempt at Rookie of the year honors in the No. 66, but that was soon aborted due to a lack of funding. At the end of the season, the Army/National Guard and Belnavis left for Roush Racing. Still, the team looked like it might come back. Carter teamed up with a British-based motorsports group called TorqueSpeed. The team was to be known as TorqueSpeed Carter and run a limited Cup schedule in 2004 with John Mickel as the driver. However, this new alliance never saw the track.

Rebirth
In 2004, Carter left NASCAR's top division to focus on mentoring his son Matt Carter who was working his way up the stock car ranks in the USAR Hooters Pro Cup Series. For two years, Carter drove for other teams while under his father's guidance. In 2007, Travis Carter announced his return to NASCAR with the help of Newman/Haas Racing co-owner Carl Haas, Indianapolis Motor Speedway chairman Mari Hulman George, and Mi-Jack Company founder Michael A. Lanigan. Their driver was Kyle Krisiloff and they carried the No. 14 with ppc Racing's No. 22's owner points from 2006. Sponsorship was originally limited to Clabber Girl, owned by Hulman & Company. Later in the season Walgreens and Eli Lilly and Company signed on to sponsor the car. At one point in the 2007 campaign, the team was to be merged with Yates/Newman/Haas/Lanigan Racing as a part of a deal between team owner Carl Haas and Nextel Cup owner Robert Yates. The team was to be the second Busch team for YNHL until Robert Yates announced his retirement following the 2007 season and ended the partnership with Newman/Haas/Lanigan Racing. Krisiloff was released at the end of the season, and the team lost its sponsors as well. The team began the 2008 season under the banner of Richardson-Haas Motorsports, and the team ran at Daytona in 2008 with David Gilliland sponsored by Music City Illinois but crashed out. The team was to run at Auto Club Speedway with Eric Norris but withdrew.

Results

Primary Car Results

Secondary Car Results

See also 
Other teams owned by Carl Haas:
Newman/Haas Racing
Haas Lola

References

External links
Travis Carter Winston Cup Owner Statistics
Carl Haas Owner Statistics

American auto racing teams
Entertainment companies established in 1990
Companies based in North Carolina
Defunct NASCAR teams
Eli Lilly and Company
Defunct companies based in North Carolina
Entertainment companies disestablished in 2007
1990 establishments in North Carolina
2007 disestablishments in North Carolina